Andrei Aleksandrovich Vorobyov (born 27 March 1982) is a former Russian professional footballer.

Club career
He made his debut in the Russian Premier League in 2000 for FC Rostselmash Rostov-on-Don before being transferred following the end of the 2002 season.

Honours
 Russian Cup finalist: 2003.

Personal life
His father Aleksandr Vorobyov was a footballer, he made an appearance for the USSR national team.

References

1982 births
Sportspeople from Rostov-on-Don
Living people
Russian footballers
Association football forwards
FC Rostov players
FC Ural Yekaterinburg players
FC SKA Rostov-on-Don players
FC Salyut Belgorod players
FC Taganrog players
Russian Premier League players